is a standard program on Unix and Unix-like operating systems that lists, edits and reexecutes commands previously entered to an interactive shell. fc is a builtin command in the Bash and Zsh shells and is an initialism for "fix command". It is particularly helpful for editing complex, multi-line commands. The editor can be specified by setting the EDITOR (changes the default editor) or the FCEDIT environment variable.

Examples 

Flag -l used to list previous command history, with example showing command ls as item 1001 in the user's history. 

$ fc -l
1001 ls

Flag -s with this index would then recall the history command from 1001:

$ fc -s 1001
ls

Though more powerfully, -s enables inline substitution.

$ ls floder
[user typo]

$ fc -s ^floder^folder^
ls folder
[Command revised and runs with correction]

Most powerfully, executing fc on its own edits the last command executed. Editor can be specified on command line (-e) or via environment variable FCEDIT. User is thus able to fully modify the last command executed via the editor, upon exiting will execute the resultant command. 

$ fc
[Change 'ls' to 'ls -la' in editor and exit]
ls -la

See also 
 List of Unix commands
 Solaris manual page for fc command

References

External links 

Standard Unix programs
Unix SUS2008 utilities